Mac Echdach is a Scottish surname. Notable people with the surname include:

 Alpín mac Echdach, disambiguation
 Eochaid mac Echdach, king of Dál Riata
 Fergus mac Echdach, king of Dál Riata (modern western Scotland)